"Master Harold"...and the boys is a play by Athol Fugard.  Set in 1950, it was first produced at the Yale Repertory Theatre in March 1982 and made its premiere on Broadway on 4 May at the Lyceum Theatre, where it ran for 344 performances. The play takes place in South Africa during apartheid era, and depicts how institutionalized racism, bigotry or hatred can become absorbed by those who live under it. It is said to be a semi-autobiographical play, as Athol Fugard's birth name was Harold and his boyhood was very similar to Hally's, including his father being disabled, and his mother running a tea shop to support the family. His relationship with his family's servants was similar to Hally's as he sometimes considered them his friends, but other times treated them like subservient help, insisting that he be called "Master Harold", and once spitting in the face of one he had been close to.

The play initially was banned from production in South Africa. It was the first of Fugard's plays to premiere outside of South Africa.

Plot
Servants Sam and Willie are practising ballroom steps in preparation for a major competition, while maintaining Hally's mother's tea shop on a rainy day. Sam is the more worldly of the two. When Willie says his ballroom partner and girlfriend is lacking enthusiasm, Sam points out that Willie beats her.

Seventeen-year-old Hally arrives home from school, and cheerfully asks after the dancing progress. Sam mentors the boy, wishing to guide him through adolescence into manhood. Willie is the "loyal black"; who calls the white Afrikaner boy "Master Harold".

The conversation between the three moves from Hally's school-work, to an intellectual discussion on "A Man of Magnitude", where they mention various historical figures of the time and their contribution to society, to flashbacks of Hally, Sam and Willie when they lived in a boarding house. Hally warmly remembers the simple act of flying a kite Sam had made for him out of junk, made to cheer Hally up after he was embarrassed by his father's public drunkenness. Conversation then turns to Hally's 500-word English composition. The ballroom dancing floor is described as "a world without collisions"; a transcendent metaphor for life.

Almost immediately despair returns: Sam had early on mentioned why Hally's mother is not present; the hospital had called about his father, who has been there receiving treatment for complications from a leg he lost in World War I, to discharge him, and she had left to bring him home. However, Hally, indicating that his father had been in considerable pain the previous day, insisted that his father wasn't well enough to be discharged, and that the call must've been about a bad turn, rather than a discharge notice. A call from Hally's mother at the hospital confirms that Hally's father is manipulating the hospital into discharging him, although he is indeed not feeling any better than before, so it's still unofficial, and Hally remains hopeful that the discharge won't happen. A second call from Hally's mother later reveals that the discharge is official, and Hally's father is now home.

Hally is distraught about this news, since his father, who in addition to being crippled, is revealed to be a tyrannical alcoholic, and his being home will make home life unbearable with his drinking, fighting, and need for constant treatment, which includes demeaning tasks of having to massage his stump, and empty chamber pots of urine. Hally vents to his two black friends years of anger, and pain, viciously mocking his father and his condition. But when Sam chastises him for doing so, Hally, although ashamed of himself, turns on him, unleashing vicarious racism that he learned from his father, creating possibly permanent rifts in his relationship with both Sam and Willie. For the first time, apart from hints throughout the play, Hally begins explicitly to treat Sam and Willie as subservient help rather than as friends or playmates, insisting that Sam call him "Master Harold" and spitting on him, among other things. Sam is hurt and angry and both he and Willie are just short of attacking Hally, but they both understand that Hally is really causing himself the most pain.

There is a glimmer of hope for reconciliation at the end, when Sam addresses Hally by his nickname again and asks to start over the next day, harkening back to the simple days of the kite. Hally, horrified about what he's done, is barely able to face Sam, responding without looking up "It's still raining, Sam. You can't fly kites on rainy days, remember," then asks Willie to lock up the tea shop, and walks out into the rain, as Sam mentions that the bench Hally sat on as he flew the kite said "Whites Only" but Hally was too excited to notice it, and that he can (figuratively) leave it at any time. The play ends while Sam and Willie console each other by ballroom dancing together.

Critical reception
John Simon, writing for New York magazine, was measured in his review:

Frank Rich of The New York Times praised the performance at the original Broadway premiere: Andy Propst of Time Out ranked it the 42nd greatest play of all time.

Casting history
The principal casts of notable productions of Master Harold... and the Boys

Ivanek left to make the film The Sender in 1982, which is why he was replaced by Price.

The Afrikaans version was translated by Idil Sheard as Master Harold en die Boys.

Adaptations

1985 film

Fugard adapted the play for a television film produced in 1985, directed by Michael Lindsay-Hogg starring Matthew Broderick, Zakes Mokae and John Kani.

2010 film

A feature film version of the play was produced in South Africa in 2009 starring Freddie Highmore (Charlie and the Chocolate Factory, Finding Neverland) as Hally and Ving Rhames (Pulp Fiction, Mission Impossible 1–3) as Sam. The film was directed by Lonny Price (who played Hally in the original Broadway cast) and produced by Zaheer Goodman-Bhyat, Mike Auret, Nelle Nugent and David Pupkewitz.

Awards
 1982 Drama Desk Award - Outstanding New Play
 1982 Outer Critics Circle Award - Outstanding Actor In A Play (Zakes Mokae)
 1982 Outer Critics Circle Award - Outstanding Director (Athol Fugard)
 1982 Outer Critics Circle Award - Outstanding New Broadway Play
 1982 Theatre World Award - Danny Glover
 1982 Tony Award - Featured Actor In A Play (Zakes Mokae)
Source: Playbill (vault)

 1983 London Critics' Circle Theatre Award - Best Play
 1983 London Evening Standard Award - Best Play

References

Further reading

External links

1982 plays
Plays by Athol Fugard
Broadway plays
Censorship in the arts
Drama Desk Award-winning plays
South African plays
Postcolonial literature
Plays set in South Africa
Plays about apartheid
Fiction set in 1950
Plays set in the 1950s
Race-related controversies in theatre
South African plays adapted into films
Censorship in South Africa